State Route 269 (SR 269) is a  long east-west state highway in central Middle Tennessee.

Route description

Rutherford County

SR 269 begins in Rutherford County in Allisona at an intersection with US 31A/SR 11, just a few hundred feet east of the Williamson County line. It heads east to enter Eagleville, where it has a concurrency with US 41A/SR 16 through downtown before splitting off along SR 99. They then leave Eagleville and head east through farmland for several miles to just west of Rockvale, where SR 269 splits from SR 99 and heads southeast through wooded and hilly terrain. SR 269 then re enters farmland and wind its way east past some subdivisions, where it crosses over the West Fork of the Stones River, before passing through Christiana, where it has an intersection and short concurrency with US 231/SR 10. The highway now turns south and winds its through some hills before crossing into Bedford County.

Bedford County

SR 269 winds its way due south through some hills to pass through Bell Buckle, where it has an extremely short concurrency with SR 82 in downtown. It then turns southeast to pass through farmland before passing through Wartrace, where it has a short concurrency with SR 64. The highway then winds its way through farmland and rural areas for several miles, where it crosses the Garrison Fork and the Duck River, before passing through the community of Cortner and the town of Normandy. SR 269 now turns directly south and heads through mountains to cross into Coffee County.

Coffee County

SR 269 almost immediately enters the city of Tullahoma and passes by several businesses along N Atlantic Street before crossing an overpass over N Washington Street and making a sharp right onto Marbury Crossing shortly before coming to an end at another intersection with US 41A/SR 16 just north of downtown. Ironically, even though SR 269 is signed east-west for its entire length, it is signed north-south at this intersection.

Other Information

Throughout its entire length, SR 269 is a two-lane highway.

Major intersections

References

269
Transportation in Rutherford County, Tennessee
Transportation in Bedford County, Tennessee
Transportation in Coffee County, Tennessee